Pesaha appam or Kurisappam is a firm rice cake made by the Saint Thomas Christians of Kerala, India to be served on the night of Maundy Thursday (Pesaha). It is made from rice batter like palappam, but is not fermented with yeast in its preparation.  A cross is made using the palm leaves from Palm Sunday and placed in the middle of the batter.

Background
The Pesaha celebration of Saint Thomas Christians falls on Western Maundy Thursday and lasts for a single day. Traditionally, Pesaha appam is served in a ceremonial manner at night in Catholic households across Kerala. The head of the family cuts the appam, dips it in paalukurukku (syrup) or Pesaha pal (coconut milk), and serves it to the other family members. The brown palkurukku is made mainly using jaggery and coconut milk. The meal also includes small banana variants in Kerala such as poovan pazham or njalipoovan pazham. Some families have the custom of singing traditional Kerala Nasrani Christian songs during this meal.

The Pesaha appam is said to derive from traditional Jewish matza. Like matza, it is prepared without yeast.

See also
 List of Indian breads

References

External links

Pancakes
Fermented foods
Saint Thomas Christians
Indian breads
Kerala cuisine
Easter bread